Communication Education is a peer-reviewed publication of the National Communication Association published by Taylor & Francis. Communication Education publishes original scholarships that advance understanding of the role of communication in the teaching and learning process in diverse spaces, structures, and interactions, within and outside of academia. Communication Education welcomes scholarships from diverse perspectives and methodologies, including quantitative, qualitative, and critical/textual approaches. All submissions must be methodologically rigorous and theoretically grounded and geared toward advancing knowledge production in communication, teaching, and learning. 

Scholarships in Communication Education address the intersections of communication, teaching, and learning related to topics and contexts that include but are not limited to:

 student/teacher relationships
 student/teacher characteristics
 student/teacher identity construction
 student learning outcomes
 student engagement
 diversity, inclusion, and difference
 social justice
 instructional technology/social media
 the basic communication course
 service learning
 communication across the curriculum
 communication instruction in business and the professions
 communication instruction in civic arenas

In addition to articles, the journal occasionally publishes scholarly exchanges on topics related to communication, teaching, and learning, such as:

 Analytic review articles: agenda-setting pieces including examinations of key questions about the field
 Forum essays: themed pieces for dialogue or debate on current communication, teaching, and learning issues

Abstracting and indexing 
The journal is abstracted and indexed in

External links 
 

English-language journals
Taylor & Francis academic journals
Publications established in 1952
Quarterly journals
Education journals
Communication journals